Amata perixanthia is a moth of the family Erebidae first described by George Hampson in 1898. It is found in Taiwan, Tibet and eastern China.

References

Perixan
Moths of Asia
Fauna of the Himalayas
Fauna of Tibet
Lepidoptera of Nepal
Moths described in 1898